João Rafael dos Santos (born 17 March 1960 in Faro, Algarve), known as Skoda, is a Portuguese former professional footballer who played as a central midfielder.

References

External links

1960 births
Living people
People from Faro, Portugal
Portuguese footballers
Association football midfielders
Primeira Liga players
Liga Portugal 2 players
Segunda Divisão players
S.C. Farense players
Boavista F.C. players
Portimonense S.C. players
Portugal international footballers
Sportspeople from Faro District